Khatun means Queen, Emperor's consort and high-ranking noblewoman in Mongolian (Khatan in modern Mongolian). They were very influential at the ordo (palace) of the Mongol regimes in various times.

References

See also
List of Mongol Khans
List of Mongol consorts
List of empresses of the Yuan dynasty

khatuns
Mongol khatuns

Khatuns